Pamela Stretton (born 15 April 1980) is a South African artist whose work deals predominantly with the female body and its commodification, beautification, and role in popular culture. Most of her works are digital ink jet prints that combine photographic images and text; they are composites of barcodes, labels, and advertisements that create a larger image of the female form.  The pieces are largely autobiographical, but also carry general themes about popular culture, fashion, health, and food. The painstaking and meticulous creation of each piece references obsessive eating disorders. Similarly, the grid mechanism portrays the pressures of conformity. Her style has been called a female version of Chuck Close.

Career

Education
Stretton received her Bachelor of Fine Art (with distinction) from Rhodes University in 2002 and her Master of Fine Art (with distinction) from the University of Cape Town in 2005.

Exhibitions
2002 Rhodes University Graduate Exhibition, Grahamstown
2003 Absa L'Atelier, Johannesburg 
2005 Sanlam Vuleka, Bellville, Cape Town
2005 Michaelis School of Fine Art Graduate Exhibition, Cape Town
2006 Portrait Exhibition. Association for Visual Arts, Cape Town
2006 15th Art Salon at The Bay, The Bay Hotel, Camps Bay, Cape Town
2006 The Encoded Body, Association for Visual Arts, Cape Town
2006 Winchester Hotel, Cape Town
2007 South African Artists, Gallery in Cork Street, London
2007 Rust en Vrede Gallery, Durbanville
2007 Interwoven/ Intertwined. FNB Private Clients' Art Route, Cultivaria, Paarl (curated by the artist)
2007 Surface Tension. The Photographers Gallery, Cape Town
2007 16th Art Salon, Rose Korber Art, Camps Bay, Cape Town
2007 Spier Contemporary, Stellenbosch, Cape
2007 The Encoded Body Series, Gallery on the Square, Sandton, Johannesburg (in collaboration with Rose Korber Art, Cape Town)
2008 RE: CM (Regarding Capital Management) Salon Exhibition, Cape Town

Collections
 Katrine Harries Print Cabinet, Michaelis School of Fine Art, University of Cape Town
 Hollard Insurance, Johannesburg (Private Collection)
 University of South Africa, Pretoria
 Coronation Fund Managers, Stellenbosch, Cape

References

External links
Stephanie Breitbard Fine Arts

1980 births
Living people
21st-century South African women artists
Rhodes University alumni 
University of Cape Town alumni